KISM (92.9 MHz) is a commercial FM radio station in Bellingham, Washington, United States. The station's transmitter is on Mount Constitution on Orcas Island, within Moran State Park.  KISM is run by the Cascade Radio Group, owned by Saga Communications.  It airs a classic rock radio format.

KISM serves Northwest Washington with a strong signal that reaches into Greater Vancouver and Victoria in Canada and can also be heard in Seattle's northern suburbs, as well as the Olympic Peninsula.

History
In March 1960, the station first signed on as KGMI-FM.  It was owned by International Good Music, Inc., serving as the FM counterpart to AM 790 KGMI.  The two stations simulcast their programming.  It switched to KVGM in 1970.

In 1973, it began airing an automated Top 40 format, changing to its current call sign, KISM.

In 1998, Saga Communications purchased KISM and KGMI for $9.8 million.

References

External links

ISM
Classic rock radio stations in the United States
Radio stations established in 1960
1960 establishments in Washington (state)